Josefina Perpétua Pitra Diakité was the ambassador of Angola to South Africa from 2011 until 2017. She was the ambassador of Angola to the United States from 2001 to September 1, 2011.

Her successor as ambassador to the United States is Alberto do Carmo Bento Ribeiro, since 2011.

References

 

Year of birth missing (living people)
Living people
Ambassadors of Angola to South Africa
Ambassadors of Angola to Sweden
Ambassadors of Angola to the United States
Angolan women ambassadors